Amir Tahmuras Darbandi was a member of House of Shirvanshah, ruling dynasty of Shirvan. He was a great-grandson of Shirvanshah Keykubad I and cousin of Khalilullah I.

Life
The exact date of his birth is not known. He was appointed as chief commander of Shirvan army after the death of his father. He was killed near Samur river while battling with forces of Junayd Safavi. He was buried in Shirvanshahs' Palace. His gravestone has especially remarkable ornaments with inscription on it:

This illimunated grave and purifying afterlife place, the most holy sepulchre belongs to son of Sheikh Bahlul (may Allah have mercy on him), who is deceased, who is forgiven of sins, who is a martyr that earned Allah's mercy, sublime, genius, magnanimous, greatest amir, generous and courageous, lord of all of the worlds commanders - Amir Tahmuras. Hijri 863, Jumada al-Thani. (5 April - 4 May 1459)

See also
Darbandi (disambiguation)

References

Shirvanshahs